John A. Cuthbert House is a house built in 1811 in Beaufort.  It was listed on the National Register of Historic Places in 1972.

It is included in the Beaufort Historic District, which is a National Historic Landmark.

References

External links

Houses on the National Register of Historic Places in South Carolina
Houses in Beaufort, South Carolina
Historic American Buildings Survey in South Carolina
National Register of Historic Places in Beaufort County, South Carolina
Historic district contributing properties in South Carolina